The Hillsboro State Bank Building (now known as the Office of Trinkle, Redman, Swanson, Coton, Davis, & Smith P.A.) is a historic bank in Plant City, Florida, United States. It was designed by Francis J. Kennard. Located at 121 North Collins Street, it was added to the U.S. National Register of Historic Places on August 1, 1984.

References

External links
 Hillsborough County listings at National Register of Historic Places
 Florida's Office of Cultural and Historical Programs
 Hillsborough County listings
 Hillsborough State Bank Building

National Register of Historic Places in Hillsborough County, Florida
Plant City, Florida
1914 establishments in Florida
Buildings and structures completed in 1914